Frigate or variant, may refer to:

 Frigate, a type of warship
 Steam frigate
 Frigate captain (aka "Frigate" or "Captain") naval officer rank usually equivalent to "OF-4"
 Frigatebird (aka "frigate"; familia Fregatidae) seabirds
 Frigate (album), 1994 rock album by April Wine
 Frigate: Sea War in the Age of Sail, a 1974 board wargame about naval combat during the Age of Sail

See also

 
 
 List of frigates (warships)
 List of frigate classes (warship classes)
 Frigate Bird (disambiguation)
 6 Frigate (disambiguation)